Coolidge station was a train station formerly served by Amtrak's Sunset Limited and Texas Eagle trains. Amtrak service to this station was discontinued in June 1996 when trains were rerouted to Maricopa.

References

External links
Map of the station

Former Amtrak stations in Arizona
Railway stations closed in 1996
Transportation in Maricopa County, Arizona
Former Southern Pacific Railroad stations
1996 disestablishments in Arizona